Dmytro Anatoliiovych Chyhrynskyi (born 7 November 1986) is a Ukrainian professional footballer who plays as a centre-back for Super League Greece club Ionikos.

He spent most of his professional career, from 2002 to 2015, in two spells with Shakhtar Donetsk. He won honours at the club including five Ukrainian Premier League titles, as many Ukrainian Cups, and the UEFA Cup in 2009. He spent the 2009–10 season with Barcelona in Spain, joining for €25 million, playing rarely and returning to Shakhtar for €15 million.

Chyhrynskyi represented the Ukraine national team from 2007 to 2011, making 29 appearances. He was in the nation's squad for the 2006 FIFA World Cup, but did not play due to injury.

Early life
Chyhrynskyi was born in Iziaslav, Khmelnytskyi Oblast, Ukrainian SSR. He was a player in the UFK Lviv youth system before moving to Donetsk at the age of 14, completing his development at the Shakhtar Donetsk academy. He holds a master's degree in liberal arts.

Club career

Shakhtar Donetsk

Chyhrynskyi earned his debut in the Vyshcha Liha in 2004, at the age of 17. In 2005, he was loaned out to Ukrainian club Metalurh Zaporizhzhia, where he experienced continuous top flight football. After a successful stint at Metalurh, Dmytro was brought back to Donetsk. He quickly emerged as a consistent defender and a leading figure, and first experienced UEFA Champions League football when coming on as a substitute against Barcelona during the 2004–05 UEFA Champions League. The young player cemented a starting position at the team in the 2006–07 season, by the end of which, at the age of 20, he captained Shakhtar in the Ukrainian Cup final against Dynamo Kyiv in the absence of the regular captain, Matuzalém.

During the 2007–08 season, Chyhrynskyi was selected as the vice-captain of the team. During the season, he was voted man of the match in the 2–0 win over rivals Dynamo Kyiv in the Ukrainian Cup Final. Also in the same season, he won the Vyshcha Liha with Shakhtar.

At the beginning of the 2008–09 season, Chyhrynskyi helped the squad win the Ukrainian Super Cup. With Shakhtar, he played in the group stage of the UEFA Champions League, finishing third in the group behind Barcelona and Sporting CP. This was not the end of the club's European journey, however, as they parachuted down to the UEFA Cup. He helped the team make it to the quarter-final stage, defeating 1993 European Champions Marseille. They then progressed to the semi-finals, where they played Ukrainian rivals Dynamo Kyiv. Shakhtar progressed to the 2009 UEFA Cup Final against Werder Bremen – Chyhrynskyi and Shakhtar won the trophy 2–1 after extra time.

Barcelona
On 26 August 2009, after long negotiations between Shakhtar and Barcelona, a deal was reached for the transfer of Chyhrynskyi. The transfer was valued at around €25 million and included the clause that Chyhrynskyi play in the UEFA Super Cup for his former club, coincidentally against Barcelona. On 31 August 2009, Barcelona confirmed that Chyhrynskyi had passed a medical and signed for five years. Chyhrynskyi was the first Ukrainian player to ever play for Barcelona and was expected to display his ability with the ball at his feet and "aerial presence and strong defensive skills" .

Chyhrynskyi made his debut for Barcelona on 12 September 2009 in La Liga against Getafe. He played a full 90 minutes on his debut, a 2–0 victory.

Though Barcelona retained the title, Chyhrynskyi fared poorly in his debut season with the club. Despite this, manager Pep Guardiola had been keen to keep him.

Return to Shakhtar Donetsk

On 6 July 2010, Chyhrynskyi signed a five-year deal to return to his former club Shakhtar Donetsk for a fee of €15 million, making Shakhtar a profit of €10 million. after spending just one season with the Spanish team, playing just 14 times. On 3 November 2010, Chyhrynskyi scored a header against Arsenal in the Champions League from a Jádson free-kick via a deflection off Craig Eastmond.

Chyhrynskyi left Shakhtar by mutual consent on 2 February 2015.

Dnipro
Seven days after leaving Shakhtar, Chyhrynskyi joined fellow league team Dnipro on a free transfer and signed a one-year contract.

AEK Athens
On 11 June 2016, Chyhrynskyi signed a two-year contract with a possible extension for a third with Super League Greece club AEK Athens. On 26 February 2017 he scored his first goal for the club in a 3–0 home win against AEL. The following 4 February, he scored in a 2–1 away win against champions Olympiacos, his first goal for the 2017–18 season.

In mid-April 2021, the Ukrainian defender was unsure about his future, as his contract was not likely to be renewed and he was strongly considering retiring and serving the team from another official post. On 15 June 2021, AEK Athens announced that Chyhrynskyi would not continue with the club.

Ionikos
On 9 September 2021, Chyhrynskyi signed a one-year contract with newly promoted Super League Greece club Ionikos. On 6 July 2022 he extended his contract with Ionikos for one year more.

International career

After a successful 2005–06 season, Chyhrynskyi was called up to the 2006 FIFA World Cup squad by coach Oleg Blokhin, following the injury to Serhiy Fedorov. Shortly before the World Cup, Chyhrynskyi was a member of the Ukraine under-21 team, which finished as runners-up in the 2006 UEFA European Under-21 Championship. Showing impressive form during the championship, he was selected as a member of the team of the tournament by UEFA. Although set to be a part of Ukraine's World Cup squad, Chyhrynskyi suffered an injury during the closing stages of under-21 competition, which forced him out of the entire forthcoming tournament.

Following his recovery from injury, Chyhrynskyi established himself as a starter for Ukraine in UEFA Euro 2008 qualifying.

Career statistics

Club

International
Source:

Honours
Shakhtar Donetsk
Vyshcha Liha/Ukrainian Premier League: 2004–05, 2005–06, 2007–08, 2010–11, 2012–13
Ukrainian Cup: 2007–08, 2012–13
Ukrainian Super Cup: 2008, 2013
UEFA Cup: 2008–09

Barcelona
La Liga: 2009–10
FIFA Club World Cup: 2009

AEK Athens
Super League Greece: 2017–18

Ukraine U21
UEFA European Under-21 Championship runner-up: 2006

Individual
UEFA European Under-21 Championship Team of the Tournament: 2006
Super League Greece Team of the Year: 2017–18

References

External links

 
 

1986 births
Living people
People from Izyaslav
Ukrainian footballers
Ukraine youth international footballers
Ukraine under-21 international footballers
Ukraine international footballers
Association football defenders
FC Karpaty-3 Lviv players
FC Shakhtar Donetsk players
FC Shakhtar-2 Donetsk players
FC Shakhtar-3 Donetsk players
FC Metalurh Zaporizhzhia players
FC Barcelona players
FC Dnipro players
AEK Athens F.C. players
Ionikos F.C. players
Ukrainian Premier League players
Ukrainian First League players
Ukrainian Second League players
La Liga players
Super League Greece players
2006 FIFA World Cup players
UEFA Cup winning players
Ukrainian expatriate footballers
Expatriate footballers in Greece
Expatriate footballers in Spain
Ukrainian expatriate sportspeople in Greece
Ukrainian expatriate sportspeople in Spain
Sportspeople from Khmelnytskyi Oblast